Mauro Pastore (La Spezia, 11.08.1967) Co-Founder and Creative Director, Cacao Design, Milano. President and Co-Founder, Eulda Books, Milano.

Mauro Pastore, along with Masa Magnoni and Alessandro Floridia, is founding partner, creative and design director of Cacao Design. Since its launch just four years ago, the firm's work has achieved international recognition from Novum, Kak Design Magazine, The Red-Dot Communication, The ADCI, The How Design Annual, The Best of Brochure Design, ReBrand100, Type Directors Club, International Design Yearbook, Logolounge, D&AD Global Awards, ED-Awards e Crack World New Graphic Design.

But Mauro has been appearing in international Design Annuals since 1991, starting with an Honorable Mention from the Art Directors Club of Europe while working at Franco Gaffuri Comunicazione, one of Italy's leading design firms at the time, where he started his career in 1988. Also worth noting is the recent, much sought-after international gold medal received at the Sappi 2007 Printers of the Year Award for the “micro macro” calendar, designed by Cacao Design for Fontegrafica.

Before Cacao Design, he was one of the founders of Inox Design, another well-known Milanese design firm, where he worked for ten years (1993–2003). Between 1997 and 2002 he also spent one or two months each year as a freelance Senior Designer for Baker Brand Communications (Santa Monica, California) and Mucca Design (New York).

Together with his Cacao Design partners, in 2006 Mauro founded Eulda Books, a new publishing house with the goal of promoting excellence in design through publications of the highest quality. The first publishing project was launched in February 2006: Eulda, the European Logo Design Annual, which as of January ‘08 evolved into Wolda, the Worldwide Logo Design Annual.

His portfolio of work includes projects for AtisReal, Banca Intesa, Blinko, Casa Damiani, CB Richard Ellis, Cushman & Wakefield, EDS Electronic Data Systems Corporation, Fontegrafica, GPAM Generali Properties Asset Management, JLL Jones Lang Lasalle, Kellogg's, Kiver, Mtv Networks, Nuna Lie, Sector Group, Sixty Group, Statuto, Unicredit Group and many others.

In October 2006, Mauro Pastore served on the jury for ReBrand 2007, an international design competition. The panel was composed of brand experts from around the world from Xerox, P&G, and Interbrand in addition to Cacao Design.

Mauro Pastore is a professional member of the following associations:
Aiap (Associazione Italiana per la Comunicazione Visiva), TDC (Type Directors Club) and AIGA (the professional association for design).

References

1967 births
Italian businesspeople
Living people